Revival FM was a British Christian-based community radio station in Scotland, operating under a Community Radio Licence.

The station was located in Cumbernauld near Glasgow and commenced broadcasting on 100.8MHz FM on 3 September 2006. An initial 5 year licence was awarded by Ofcom (Office Of Communications) to permit broadcasts until September 2011. In March 2011 the station announced that this licence had been extended for a further 5 years taking broadcasts through until September 2016, with an extension to the licence awarded until September 2021.   

In 2018 Ofcom awarded a second licence to Revival FM which allowed it to establish a transmitter in the City of Glasgow. This came on air at Easter 2019 on 93MHz FM.  Also in 2019, the station's output was added to the DAB output of the small scale trial mux in Glasgow operated by Brave Broadcasting.

The station's output was available online at www.revival.fm. Revival FM comes from a history of ten years of part-time broadcasting under the callsign Revival Radio. The station is operated by Revival Radio Ltd which is a recognised Scottish charity.

The station aired a mixture of Christian music (contemporary and traditional), topical debate and discussion, community focus and features, devotional and prayer programmes, news and sport.   Revival FM also hosted or promoted various Christian concerts in different locations in Scotland.

The station was rendered insolvent in November 2022.

References

External links

Radio stations established in 2006
Radio stations disestablished in 2022
Radio stations in Scotland
Community radio stations in the United Kingdom
Christian radio stations in the United Kingdom
Charities based in Scotland
Evangelical radio stations
Defunct radio stations in the United Kingdom